Lee Michael Feldman (born 1967/1968) is an American lawyer and businessman, and the chairman of GVC Holdings, the FTSE 100 Index gambling conglomerate, and the managing partner of the private equity firm, Twin Lakes Capital Management, LLC.

Early life
Feldman earned a bachelor's degree and a juris doctor in law, both from Columbia University.

Career
Feldman started his career as a corporate lawyer for O'Sullivan, Graev and Karabell.

In December 2004, Feldman joined GVC Holdings, and has been non-executive chairman since September 2008.

In 2007, Feldman co-founded the private equity firm, Twin Lakes Capital Management, LLC.

From at least 2008 to 2012, Feldman was CEO of Aurora Brands, which owns the home furnishing brands MacKenzie-Childs and Jay Strongwater.

In 2017, Feldman and the CEO of GVC, Kenny Alexander earned a total of £26.9 million, and 44% of shareholders voted against the company's remuneration report.

In March 2019, Sky News reported that Feldman would leave the company on or before the company's "annual general meeting next year". Steven Stradbrooke of CalvinAyers.com has reported that date to be June 5. While Feldman was overdue to leave under UK corporate governance code that recommends chairs of listed companies not stay in position longer than nine years, the news came two weeks after Feldman sold £6m worth of his GVC shares and CEO Alexander sold shares worth £13.7m, which led to GVC's share price falling nearly 14% in a single day.

Personal life
Feldman is married to Lauren Feldman. They live in New York City, and have three children.

References

Living people
1960s births
Columbia Law School alumni
American lawyers
American company founders
People from Boston
American chairpersons of corporations
Private equity and venture capital investors